Girl from Avenue A is a 1940 American comedy film, directed by Otto Brower. It stars Jane Withers, Kent Taylor, and Kay Aldridge.

Cast
 Jane Withers as Jane
 Kent Taylor as MacMillan Forrester
 Kay Aldridge as Lucy
 Elyse Knox as Angela
 Laura Hope Crews as Mrs. Forrester
 Jessie Ralph as Mrs. Van Dyke
 Harry Shannon as Timson
 Ann Shoemaker as Mrs. Maddox
 Rand Brooks as Steve
 Vaughan Glaser as Bishop Phelps
 George Humbert as Sylvester Gallupi

References

External links
Girl from Avenue A at the Internet Movie Database

1940 films
American comedy films
1940 comedy films
Films directed by Otto Brower
American black-and-white films
20th Century Fox films
1940s American films